Ağcakənd or Aghjakand or Agdzhakend may refer to:
Ağcakənd, Kalbajar, Azerbaijan
Ağcakənd, Khojavend, Azerbaijan
Ağcakənd, Lachin, Azerbaijan
Aşağı Ağcakənd, Azerbaijan
Yuxarı Ağcakənd, Azerbaijan